The 2016 Wisconsin–Whitewater Warhawks football team was an American football team that represented the University of Wisconsin–Whitewater as a member of the Wisconsin Intercollegiate Athletic Conference (WIAC) during the 2016 NCAA Division III football season. Led by second-year head coach Kevin Bullis, the Warhawks compiled an overall record of 12–1 and a mark of 7–1 in conference play, winning the WIAC title.

Schedule

References

Wisconsin–Whitewater
Wisconsin–Whitewater Warhawks football seasons
Wisconsin–Whitewater Warhawks football